A hangman's blood is a beer cocktail made of gin, whisky, rum, port, brandy, stout and champagne.

History 
It was first described by Richard Hughes in his 1929 novel, A High Wind in Jamaica. According to Hughes: 
"Hangman's blood... is compounded of rum, gin, brandy, and porter... Innocent (merely beery) as it looks, refreshing as it tastes, it has the property of increasing rather than allaying thirst, and so once it has made a breach, soon demolishes the whole fort."

Preparation 
Anthony Burgess described its preparation as pouring doubles of gin, whisky, rum, port and brandy into a pint glass. A small bottle of stout is added and the drink is topped with champagne. According to Burgess, "it tastes very smooth, induces a somewhat metaphysical elation, and rarely leaves a hangover."

See also
 Beer cocktails
 Cocktails
 List of cocktails
 Queen Mary (beer cocktail)

References

Cocktails with beer
Cocktails with gin
Cocktails with whisky
Cocktails with rum